Walbert is a small village that hosts the municipal offices of South Whitehall Township in Lehigh County, Pennsylvania. It is part of the Lehigh Valley, which has a population of 861,899 and is the 68th most populous metropolitan area in the U.S. as of the 2020 census. 

It is located on Route 309 and has easy access to U.S. Route 22, Interstate 78 and Interstate 476. It is drained by the Jordan Creek into the Lehigh River.

Unincorporated communities in Lehigh County, Pennsylvania
Unincorporated communities in Pennsylvania